At the 2010 census, there were 1,526,006 people, 590,071 households, and 352,272 families residing in the consolidated city-county of Philadelphia, Pennsylvania. The population density was 4,337.3/km2 (11,233.6/mi2). There were 661,958 housing units at an average density of 1,891.9/km2 (4,900.1/mi2).

Of the 590,071 households, 27.6% had children under the age of 18 living with them, 32.1% were married couples living together, 22.3% had a female householder with no husband present, and 40.3% were non-families. 33.8% of households were one person and 11.9% were one person aged 65 or older. The average household size was 2.48 and the average family size was 3.22.

The age distribution was 25.3% under the age of 18, 11.1% from 18 to 24, 29.3% from 25 to 44, 20.3% from 45 to 64, and 14.1% 65 or older. The median age was 34 years. For every 100 females, there were 86.8 males. For every 100 females age 18 and over, there were 81.8 males.

The median household income was $30,746 and the median family income was $37,036. Males had a median income of $34,199 versus $28,477 for females. The per capita income for the city was $16,509. 22.9% of the population and 18.4% of families were below the poverty line.  31.3% of those under the age of 18 and 16.9% of those 65 and older were living below the poverty line.

The male-female ratio was 86.8 to 100, with 46.5% of the population male and 53.5% female. Of places with 100,000 or more people, this was the third lowest in the United States. Only Gary, Indiana and Birmingham, Alabama had a higher proportion of women.

Of housing units, 590,071 (89.1%) were occupied and 71,887 (10.9%) were vacant. Of occupied housing units, 349,633 (59.3%) were owner-occupied and 240,438 (40.7%) were renter-occupied.

The mean travel time to work was 32.0 minutes for workers 16 years of age and older. Residents of Center City, however, had much shorter commutes. Center City has the second largest downtown residential population in the country, surpassing Chicago in 2015, and most walk to work.

63.97% of Philadelphians drove an automobile to work (including carpools), 25.93% commuted by public transit, 9.22% walked to work, and 0.88% commuted by bicycle. 35.74% of households did not have an automobile. The proportion of Philadelphians who do not commute by auto is high compared to most other American cities, although lower than the proportions in New York City and Washington, D.C.

Population history
From its founding in the 17th century through the early 19th century, the City of Philadelphia was considered the area between the Delaware and Schuylkill Rivers and between Vine and South Streets. Although the city proper was second to New York City in population at the time of the first U.S. Census in 1790, Philadelphia County was the most populous urban (or metropolitan) area in the nation until 1810, when it was surpassed by New York. In 1854, the Act of Consolidation incorporated the rest of Philadelphia County and created Philadelphia's modern border. This resulted in a large population increase, evident in the 1860 census.

Philadelphia experienced steady growth between 1860 and 1950, except for a brief lull in the 1930s, which was due in part to the Great Depression. Its population peaked at 2,071,605 in 1950. Between 1950 and 2000, the city lost 554,055 people, or 26.7% of its population. To put this into perspective, Chicago lost 20.0% of its population during the same era, and Baltimore lost 31.4%, according to US Census data. This nationwide trend is often referred to as "white flight", named for the movement of upper- and middle-class white families from the increasingly racially diverse cities in favor of more racially homogeneous suburbs.

In 2011, census data was released showing that Philadelphia had achieved its first confirmed population growth in 60 years. The increase was 0.6 percent. It is attributed to a variety of factors, including increased immigration (especially from countries like India, South Korea and Mexico) and migration from more expensive cities in the Northeast Corridor. Between 2000 and 2010, the city's Hispanic population increased by 44 percent to 187,611 and its Asian population grew by 42 percent to 95,521.  Wealthy transplants, Asian American investors from New York City, and African Americans from Washington, D.C. have received media attention for setting their sights on Philadelphia. The ten-year tax abatement, a historically undervalued housing market, improvements to the waterfront, and continuing redevelopment throughout the city are thought to be factors drawing people to the area.

Ethnography

For most of its early history from the 1600s and up until the mid to late 1800s, the vast majority of Philadelphia's population was Protestant and composed mainly of Protestant Anglo-Saxon English Americans,many of whom were Quakers or of Quaker descent. The city also contained significant populations of free Blacks, Welsh Americans, including a great number of Welsh Quakers, such as in the Welsh Tract, Scottish Americans, Ulster Scots Americans, and Pennsylvania Dutch, most notably the German American Mennonites and German Quakers that founded Germantown, as well as the Protestant Swedish American, Finnish American, and Dutch American families that had originally arrived in the Philadelphia area to live in the colony of New Sweden, later taken over by the Dutch colony of New Netherlands before being absorbed into the British colonies. The roots of the Mummers Parade can be traced back to a blend of the traditions of these ethnic groups in Philadelphia during this period, though the celebration would evolve and be altered by the traditions of subsequent immigrant groups.

First Immigrant Wave
Prior to the 1820s, the overwhelming majority of German and German-speaking settlers in Philadelphia such as the Pennsylvania Dutch had belonged to Protestant sects. Starting around the 1820s, an increasing number of poor Catholic Germans began to immigrate to Philadelphia, though most German immigrants to Philadelphia continued to be Protestant. By the 1840s, in response to the starvation and poverty that would lead to Great Famine of Ireland, a growing number of impoverished Irish Catholic immigrants began to settle in Philadelphia, leading to a rise in anti-Catholicism, nativism, and anti-Irish sentiment among the majority Protestant population in the city. Hatred for the newly arrived Irish Catholic immigrants culminated in the bloody anti-Irish, anti-Catholic Philadelphia Nativist Riot of 1844 and fueled the rise of the Know-Nothing Party in Philadelphia. At the same time, as the number of poor and unskilled Irish Catholic and German immigrants increased, Philadelphia experienced an increase in freed and fugitive slaves from the South seeking refuge and employment in the city. Both blacks and Irish Catholics were at the bottom of the social hierarchy in Philadelphia at the time, and poor Irish immigrants often competed with African American ex-slaves for menial or unskilled work. The competition between the two ethnic groups led to the 1842 Lombard Street Riot. Also, beginning in the mid to late 1800s, immigrants from China began to settle in Philadelphia, establishing Philadelphia's Chinatown and further diversifying the city's demographics.

Second Immigrant Wave
Like its other immigrant-magnet peers in the Northeast, starting in the late 19th and early 20th centuries, Philadelphia experienced an unprecedented heightened level of immigration. This period of immigration consisted of mainly impoverished Catholic and Jewish, and to a less extent Orthodox Christian immigrants from Southern European and Eastern European countries such as Italy and Poland, as well as a second wave of Catholic immigrants from Ireland. Around this same time, an increasing number of African Americans from the Southern United States began to settle in Philadelphia during the Great Migration.

Though Italians in Philadelphia would experience high levels of discrimination and prejudice, including intense redlining, Italians in Philadelphia also significantly altered the culture of Philadelphia and the cuisine, creating the Philadelphia Italian Market, the cheesesteak, the hoagie, and water ice, and introducing pizza and other Italian cuisine to the city. Italian and Irish immigrants and their children in South Philadelphia also revived, altered, and continued the Philadelphia tradition of the Mummers Parade.

1940s to present
Since the 1940s, Philadelphia experienced large waves of Puerto Rican migration. They remain an integral part of the city and a sizable swath of eastern North Philadelphia is considered to have the highest urban concentration of Puerto Ricans in the continental United States. The number of Hispanics and Asian Americans has increased over the past 20 years and continues to accelerate. The number of foreign-born residents increased by 34,000 between 1990 and 2000. Of foreign-born Philadelphians, 38.5% were from Asia, 30.3% were from Europe, 23.4% were from Latin America, and 6.7% were from Africa.

Recent immigrants from Asia are mainly of Indian, Korean, Chinese, Vietnamese, Laotian, Hmong, Filipino, Cambodian, Thai, Pakistani and Bangladeshi backgrounds. In addition, the Latino population continues to grow, as Dominican, Mexican, Colombian, Salvadoran, Guatemalan, Cuban, Honduran and Brazilian immigrants. Puerto Rican often choose Philadelphia when moving to the US mainland. Immigration from various Caribbean countries has also increased substantially since the 1940s. Immigrants from Africa, mainly West Africa and, to a lesser extent, Ethiopia, have also established significant communities in the city.

Non-Hispanic White people
Large concentrations of non-Hispanic whites live in Center City, Northeast Philadelphia, and Northwest Philadelphia (although this is changing). Gentrification is altering the racial demographics of predominantly Black neighborhoods close to Center City.

European immigration is also growing, with more Irish, Italian, and Polish immigrants. Recently, thousands of Russian and Ukrainian immigrants from Eastern Europe, many of whom are Jewish have arrived, mainly in Northeast Philadelphia. There are other growing nationalities, which include Spanish, Portuguese, Slovak, Greek and Serbian.

The city's Middle Eastern population has tripled since 1990, with people of Palestinian, Turkish, Azeri, Lebanese, Iranian, Egyptian, Iraqi, Saudi, Syrian and Afghan backgrounds residing in Philadelphia.

Irish

Irish immigrants and the Irish Americans are associated in the North and Northeast Philadelphia neighborhoods, including Fishtown, Kensington, Mayfair, Frankford, Port Richmond, Holmesburg, Harrowgate, and Juniata, as well as Devil's Pocket, Whitman, Gray's Ferry, and particularly Pennsport in South Philadelphia. Philadelphia has the 3rd largest Irish American population in the country.

In the 1960s, many of the Irish in Philadelphia were known to join the Philadelphia Police Department and Philadelphia Fire Department.

Italians

Italian immigrants and the Italian American community are frequently associated with South Philadelphia, including Bella Vista, Central South Philadelphia, Girard Estates, Marconi Plaza, Packer Park, and the Philadelphia Italian Market area. In Northeast Philadelphia, Italian neighborhoods are found in Roxborough, Frankford, Wissinoming and Tacony, among others. West Philadelphia also has a smaller but significant Italian and Italian American population in certain neighborhoods. Philadelphia has the 2nd largest Italian American population in the U.S.

Armenians
, there were about 25,000 people of Armenian ancestry in the Philadelphia area and/or in South Jersey. The Hamidian massacres prior to the beginning of the 20th century, and subsequent Adana massacre of 1909 and Armenian genocide prompted Armenian immigration to the U.S. There is an Armenian day school in Upper Merion Township, Armenian Sisters Academy (ASA), with a Radnor postal address. In addition organizations catering to children and churches have sponsored weekend Armenian schools. Armenian National Committee of Pennsylvania chairperson Ara Chalian stated in 2012 that the distribution of the ethnic Armenians in the area became more widespread but with the overall numbers about remaining the same.

Polish
Poles and Polish Americans, as well as Polish Jews, have a rich history in the Port Richmond-Bridesburg area, as well as areas of Kensington and the Northeast.

Non-Hispanic Black people
Non-Hispanic Black people make up 32% of Philadelphia's population, and 44% when including Hispanic Black people. The African-American population represents the vast majority of Black residents in the city and about 39% of the citywide population. The remaining Black population being Black immigrants from the Caribbean and Africa, and Afro-Hispanics within the Puerto Rican and Dominican communities.

Circa 2008, a phenomenon of polygamy occurred among Muslims in Philadelphia who were Black. Persons engaging in that behavior had the potential of being prosecuted by the state government for bigamy.

African Americans

The largest concentrations of native-born Black people are in Germantown, North Philadelphia East of Germantown Avenue, the Point Breeze neighborhood of South Philadelphia, parts of Southwest Philadelphia, and West Philadelphia. Together these neighborhoods have a population of about 610,000 and are roughly 82% black; making it the 4th largest predominantly Black area in the United States after Bedford-Stuyvesant, Brooklyn, Detroit, and South Side Chicago. Philadelphia has one of the largest African American communities in the US.

African immigrant groups
Philadelphia has one of the most notable West African populations in the United States. As of 2010, there were 25,570 people of recent African origins living in Philadelphia. The largest Sub-Saharan African populations within the city are Nigerians and Liberians.

In 2005, Philadelphia had immigrants from Ethiopia, Ghana, the Ivory Coast, Liberia, Nigeria, and Sierra Leone. By 2008, about 15,000 Liberians had immigrated to Philadelphia area, the Liberians left their native country due to two civil wars and the destruction of Liberian infrastructure. The African population is largely concentrated in West and Southwest sections of Philadelphia. However, the Cedar Park neighborhood is the only neighborhood predominantly made up of West Indian/Caribbean and Sub-Saharan African immigrants.

Around 2005, there had been instances of violence perpetrated by native-born African-Americans against African immigrants. The head of the Liberian Association of Pennsylvania, Samuel Slewion, said that as a result many African immigrants withdrew children from public schools. The head of African Congress USA, Cyprian Anyanwu, proposed a charter school to improve relations between native-born blacks and immigrants; his 2003 proposal was rejected by the city, and he issued a revised proposal in 2005.

Caribbean-Americans
Philadelphia also has a large West Indian community from the Caribbean islands. The West Indian population is largely concentrated in West Philadelphia, with smaller numbers in the Southwest and Northeast sections. As of 2010, there were 24,608 people of West Indian ancestry living in Philadelphia, representing about 1.6 percent of the city, the vast majority of which are Haitians and Jamaicans. Though, the number of West Indians balloons when including other areas in the Philadelphia metropolitan area and not just the city itself. The Philadelphia area has one of the largest Jamaican populations in the country. Jamaicans.com features Philadelphia and Jamaican culture in the city. Most West Indians live in West and Southwest Philadelphia. However, the Cedar Park neighborhood is the only neighborhood predominantly made up of West Indian/Caribbean and African immigrants.

Though, Haitians and Jamaicans are near even in population, Jamaicans represent the majority of West Indians in West Philadelphia, where most of the overall West Indian population lives. This is because Haitians are more evenly distributed throughout the city, outside of West Philadelphia, there are smaller numbers of Haitians in several neighborhoods in the Lower Northeast. Aside from Haitians and Jamaicans, there are also sizable numbers of Trinidadians and Bajans.

Hispanics and Latinos
As of the 2010 census, there were 187,611 Latinos and Hispanics in Philadelphia, constituting over 12 percent of the city's population, the vast majority of which are Puerto Ricans. Most Philadelphia Hispanics self-identify as either White, Black, Mixed, or other, for government purposes i.e. United States Census.

In the early 20th century, companies such as the Pennsylvania Railroad and Spanish-speaking immigrant networks attracted Spanish-speaking workers to Philadelphia. By 1910 several Latino and Hispanic groups had resided in Philadelphia. Cubans and Spaniards founded and initially lead the Latino and Hispanic community organizations. Due to the Immigration Act of 1924 Puerto Ricans, who were already U.S. citizens, became the predominant Hispanic group and had taken control of the organizations by the 1950s. Other Latino and Hispanic groups began establishing themselves by the 1960s. By 2005, most of the leadership was still Puerto Rican and some non-Puerto Ricans had taken some leadership positions

Puerto Ricans

As of 2010, there was a population of 121,643 Puerto Ricans living in Philadelphia. This meant that Puerto Ricans are the largest Latino group in the city and that Philadelphia has the second largest Puerto Rican population, after New York City. Though, smaller numbers of Puerto Ricans can be found throughout the city, overall, eastern North Philadelphia has one of the highest concentrations of Puerto Ricans in the country, largely the result of high levels of segregation and a very large Puerto Rican population.

Philadelphia has been a heavy Puerto Rican destination since the 1950s, though migration to the city has picked up and now Philadelphia has one of the fastest-growing Puerto Rican populations in the country. Puerto Ricans constitute over 75% of the Latino population in the city. Most Puerto Ricans live in the areas of North Philadelphia east of Germantown Avenue (eastern North Philadelphia), and to a lesser extent the Lower Northeast and Uptown sections of the city. In fact, the Fairhill section of Eastern North Philadelphia, particularly the blocks between 6th Street and B Street, north of York Street and south of Erie Avenue, have some of highest concentrations of Puerto Ricans in the country, with most blocks usually being around 85-90% Puerto Rican alone, with most of the remaining portion made up of Dominicans and African Americans. Increases in Latino immigration and migration have fueled the growth of El Centro de Oro in Fairhill.

Puerto Ricans make up the majority of Hispanics inside of the city of Philadelphia and in the Philadelphia metropolitan area as whole, numbering about 300,000 in far southeastern Pennsylvania (around Philadelphia), and neighboring areas in New Jersey and Delaware, making up 60% of Metro Philly's Hispanics and 4.5% of Philadelphia metro as a whole.

Dominicans
As of the 2010 census, there were 15,963 Dominicans in Philadelphia, up from 4,337 in 2000. Dominicans are now the second-largest Hispanic group in Philadelphia and the city has the 6th largest Dominican population in the US.

Dominicans began coming to Philadelphia after 1965. Prior to 1990, there was a very small population of Dominicans. Then a significant wave of Dominican immigration started in 1990 with a group of Dominicans moving from New York to gain jobs. Though, immigration from the Dominican Republic to the Philadelphia region is increasing, most Dominicans moving to Philadelphia actually come from New York City and other nearby areas. The vast majority of Dominicans live scattered in Lower Northeast and eastern North Philadelphia especially north of Erie Avenue, sharing neighborhoods with the city's larger Puerto Rican population. Smaller numbers of Dominicans live in West Philadelphia. Recent estimates have the current Dominican population according to the 2017 Census from 29,524 to as high as 65,000 people of Dominican descent, the latter estimate giving Philadelphia the second-largest Dominican population amongst American cities. Only New York, NY has more Dominican Americans. Dominicans are one of Philadelphia's fastest growing ethnic groups.

Mexicans
As of the 2010 U.S. Census there were an estimated 15,531 Mexicans in Philadelphia, up from 6,220 in 2000.

A small group of Mexicans arrived in the 19th Century. A small group of Mexicans remained throughout the city's history. A group of Mexicans arrived in the 1970s. Small Mexican communities in South Philadelphia opened as a result of a 1990s wave of Mexican immigration. Another wave of immigration started in 1998 with Mexicans arriving from Mexico and areas outside of Mexico such as New York.

Most of Philadelphia's Mexican community lives in the area of South Philadelphia east of Broad Street, adding to the area's melting pot like cultural mix, sharing neighborhoods with Italian Americans and Asian immigrants. As of 2011 most Mexicans in South Philadelphia originate from the state of Puebla. Mexican immigrants have drastically changed the Italian area in South Philadelphia and have set up a small community in and around the market. Mexicans are the third largest Hispanic community, after Puerto Ricans and Dominicans, both of whom mainly reside in North Philadelphia.

The Carnaval de Puebla, one of the largest Poblano carnivals (a celebration of the Battle of Puebla) held in countries other than Mexico, began circa 2006. It is held every May.

Cubans
As of the 2010 census, there was an estimate of 3,930 Cubans. Cubans, along with Spaniards, had founded and initially controlled several Latino and Hispanic organizations in Philadelphia. In the early 1960s large numbers of Cuban refugees arrived in Philadelphia.

Other Latino and Hispanic groups
As of the 2010 census, Hispanics of all other Hispanic groups numbered nearly 30,000, including an estimate of 4,675 Colombians, 2,262 Guatemalans, 1,641 Hondurans, 1,542 Ecuadorians, 1,085 Peruvians, 1,049 Salvadorans, 1,006 Argentineans.

Asian Americans
The Asian American community has long been established in the city's bustling Chinatown district, but recent Vietnamese immigrants have also forged neighborhoods and bazaars alongside the venerable Italian market. Korean immigrants have notably added to the melting pot of Olney. In several decades before 2010, the cost of living in Chinatown increased due to an influx in settlement, so Asian Americans began moving to other neighborhoods in northwestern Philadelphia, northeastern Philadelphia, and South Philadelphia. As of January 22, 2010, according to David Elesh, a Temple University urban sociologist, there were almost 60,000 Philadelphia residents who stated that they were born in China and many of them lived in South Philadelphia.

There is an ethnic Pakistani congregation at St. William Church in Philadelphia.

In 1999 there were about 1,500 people who were Japanese citizens with non-immigrant visas or Japanese immigrants to the Philadelphia area. There is a weekend school for Japanese people, Japanese Language School of Philadelphia (JLSP, フィラデルフィア日本語補習授業校 Firaderufia Nihongo Hoshū Jugyō Kō) located in Wynnewood, Lower Merion Township.

Hmong
A group of Hmong refugees had settled in Philadelphia after the end of the 1970s Laotian Civil War.  They were attacked in discriminatory acts, and the city's Commission on Human Relations held hearings on the incidents. Anne Fadiman, author of The Spirit Catches You and You Fall Down, said that lower-class residents resented the Hmong receiving a $100,000 federal grant for employment assistance when they were also out of work; they believed that American citizens should be getting assistance. Bee Xiong, a Hmong leader in Philadelphia, stated that by the late 1970s there were up to 5,000 Hmong in Philadelphia but by in 1984 there were 650 Hmong. Between 1982 and 1984, three quarters of the Hmong people who had settled in Philadelphia left for other cities in the United States to join relatives who were already there. Reverend Edward V. Avery, a Roman Catholic priest quoted in The Philadelphia Inquirer, stated that unemployed black youths questioned why Hmong people instead of native-born U.S. citizens received the federal aid, and that contributed to violence against Hmong people. A U.S. Attorney, Edward S.G. Dennis, had begun an investigation by 1984. His office asked the Federal Bureau of Investigation (FBI) to determine if there was a hate crime. By the same year Xiong opened an employment assistance office to stabilize what was left of the Hmong population. He had used $100,000 in federal grants.

Native Americans
About 13,000 Philadelphians identified as Native American on the 2010 census. What is now the Philadelphia region is the ancestral territory of the Lenni Lenape, but by the mid-19th century violence and fraudulent land purchases had driven most of them out of Pennsylvania and the 21st century Native American community includes members of many other nations as well.

Religion

Christianity is the dominant religion in the city of Philadelphia. According to a 2014 study by the Pew Research Center, 68% of the population of the city identified themselves as Christians. The majority of the population is Protestant, with the various Protestant and non-Catholic Christian denominations combined make up a majority of the Christian population at approximately 42% of the city's population; however, the largest single Christian denomination is Roman Catholic, at 26%. Metropolitan Philadelphia's Jewish population, the sixth largest in the United States, was estimated at 206,000 in 2001. There is also a significant Eastern Orthodox population. The greater Philadelphia area is home to one of the largest Lutheran communities in the United States (the largest on the East Coast).

Many other religions have arrived, including Islam and Hinduism. With immigration from the Middle East, the Horn of Africa, Pakistan, Bangladesh and India, these two religions have increased their presence. The largest concentrations of Muslims and Hindus live in the Northeast and North parts of the city, Center City, West Philadelphia, and sprawling into the nearby suburbs.

The Muslim African American community in Philadelphia has grown substantially over the last decade. According to several statistics, Philadelphia has surpassed Detroit and New York City to become the American metropolitan area with the highest proportion of Muslims.

Religions with less numerous adherents can also be found. There are pockets of Buddhists in Center City, Chinatown, Northeast Philly, and other neighborhoods with significant Asian American populations. There are Caribbean and African traditional religions in North and West Philadelphia. These numbers are also growing. Historically the city has strong connections to The Religious Society of Friends, Unitarian Universalism, and Ethical Culture, all of which continue to be represented in the city. The Friends General Conference is based in Philadelphia. African diasporic religions are popular in Hispanic and Caribbean communities in North and West Philadelphia.

Ethno-religious groups

Jews

References
 Vázquez-Hernández, Víctor. "From Pan-Latino Enclaves to a Community:Puerto Ricans in Philadelphia, 1910-2000" (Chapter 4). In: Whalen, Carmen Teresa and Víctor Vázquez-Hernández (editors). The Puerto Rican Diaspora: Historical Perspectives. Temple University Press, 2005. , 9781592134144.

Notes

Sources and further reading

U.S. Census website, US Census.
Philadelphia in Focus: A Profile from Census 2000, Brookings Institution, November 2003.
 . A discussion of how Philadelphia workers found jobs and how employers found workers, including how the process was affected by race, ethnicity, origin (immigrant versus native-born), industrial sector, unionization, and other demographic differences.
"A City Transformed: The Racial and Ethnic Changes in Philadelphia Over the Last 20 Years." Pew Charitable Trusts Philadelphia Research Initiative. June 1, 2011. (Archive)
"A study of Southeast Asian youth in Philadelphia: A final report." United States Office of Refugee Resettlement, 1988.

Philadelphia
Culture of Philadelphia
Geography of Philadelphia
Economy of Philadelphia
Philadelphia